Tami Gaines is an author, marketing and business strategist, and motivational speaker and trainer.

Career
Gaines has served on the Board of Directors of the New Jersey Small Business Development Centers and the Imani College Advocacy Program.

She has won the Women in Business Future Achievers, New Jersey Chamber of Commerce, the Columbia University Service Award from the Columbia Graduate School of Business and was voted "One of 1999's Women to Know" by the Y.W.C.A.

Gaines founded the Preemie Parents Foundation to provide resources for parents of premature babies.

Bibliography 

Gaines wrote Preemie Parents: 26 Little Ways to Grow With Your Premature Baby to help those struggle with the issues associated with the delivery of a premature baby. The book was published by Sellers Publishing, March 2, 2011.

References

External links 
 Official website
 Foundation Bio
 New Jersey Small Business Development Centers
 Imani College Advocacy Program
 New York Times
 Preemie Parents Foundation
 Preemie Parents: 26 Little Ways to Grow With Your Premature Baby
 Sellers Publishing

Living people
American motivational speakers
American business writers
Women motivational speakers
Women business writers
Year of birth missing (living people)